The Uganda Patriotic Movement is a defunct political party in Uganda. It was founded by Yoweri Museveni and participated in the December 1980 general elections, which were won by Milton Obote's Uganda People's Congress. The election results were disputed, leading Museveni to form the National Resistance Movement and its military wing, the National Resistance Army, with which he waged a guerrilla rebellion against Obote's government, beginning the Ugandan Bush War. The NRM became the country's ruling party after its victory from 1986 upto date.
UPM was never withdrawn by the country's Electoral body the Uganda Electoral Commission. It still exists as one of Uganda's political parties despite being dormant with no political activity since 1984.
We can't tell who's the current the President of Uganda Patriots Movement since the EC keeps that data confidential.
Although, it's a confusing idea to identify between NRM and UPM since they were both started by the same political figures with a common idea despite one being the first before the other.

Defunct political parties in Uganda